Chester Charles Gorski (June 22, 1906 – April 25, 1975) was an American restauranteur and congressman who represented the state of New York for one term from 1949 to 1951.

Life and career
Gorski was born June 22, 1906, in Buffalo, New York, to a Polish immigrant family.  He attended Saints Peter and Paul Parochial School and Technical High School.  After his high school graduation, Gorski was employed as a foreman in Buffalo's Streets Department, and also owned a restaurant.

Early political career 
He was a member of the Erie County Board of Supervisors from 1941 to 1945, and was minority leader beginning in 1942.  He served on the Buffalo Common Council from 1946 to 1948.

Congress 
In 1948 Gorski was elected to the United States House of Representatives as a Democrat.  He served one term,  January 3, 1949, to January 3, 1951, and was an unsuccessful candidate for reelection in 1950.

Later career and death 
After leaving Congress Gorski was employed by the U.S. Department of Commerce from 1951 to 1952.  He served on the Buffalo Common Council again from 1954 to 1956.  From 1956 to 1959 he was a member of the New York State Building Code Commission.

In 1960 Gorski returned to the Buffalo Common Council as its president, and he served until resigning in 1974 because of ill health.

He died in Buffalo on April 25, 1975.  He was buried at Saint Stanislaus Roman Catholic Cemetery in Cheektowaga, New York.

Family

He was the father of former Erie County Executive Dennis Gorski and New York State Supreme Court Justice Jerome Gorski.

References

External links

American politicians of Polish descent
1906 births
1975 deaths
Politicians from Buffalo, New York
Democratic Party members of the United States House of Representatives from New York (state)
United States Department of Commerce officials
New York (state) city council members
County legislators in New York (state)
Burials in New York (state)
20th-century American politicians